The 1953 U.S. Open was the 53rd U.S. Open, held June 11–13 at Oakmont Country Club in Oakmont, Pennsylvania, a suburb northeast of Pittsburgh. Ben Hogan won a record-tying fourth U.S. Open title, six strokes ahead of runner-up Sam Snead.

Overview 
Although a three-time champion, Hogan was required to participate with the rest of the field in 36-hole qualifying on Tuesday and Wednesday,  immediately preceding the championship. The only exemption at the time was for the defending champion, Julius Boros. The field for the qualifier was 300, with one round at Oakmont and another at the Pittsburgh Field Club, host of the PGA Championship in 1937.

After qualifying, Hogan shot a tournament-low 67 (–5) in the first round on Thursday and an even-par 72 on Friday to hold a two-stroke lead over Snead and George Fazio. Snead's third-round 72 on Saturday morning left him just a shot back of Hogan heading into the final round in the afternoon. With nine holes to go in the final round, Snead trailed by just one shot. Hogan made three birdies on Oakmont's back nine, including a  birdie putt at 13 on his way to a 71 and a 283 total, six shots clear of Snead, who shot a final round 76. Hogan's first-round 67 and Snead's second-round 69 were the only sub-70 rounds by any players for the entire tournament. Hogan's win at Oakmont was his fourth U.S. Open title, equaling the record of Willie Anderson and Bobby Jones (Jack Nicklaus would win his fourth U.S. Open in 1980). The four wins came in the last five U.S. Opens in which Hogan had entered; he missed the 1949 edition following his near-fatal automobile accident.

Two future champions made their U.S. Open debuts in 1953 as amateurs: Arnold Palmer, 23, of nearby Latrobe and Ken Venturi, 22, of San Francisco. Both missed the cut; Venturi (78-76=154) by one  stroke, Palmer (84-78=162) by nine.

Hogan in 1953 
Already the Masters champion, Hogan followed up his U.S. Open win with another at the British Open at Carnoustie a few weeks later. He became the first to win three professional majors in a single season, a feat matched only by Tiger Woods in 2000. Through 2018, Hogan remains the only golfer in history to win the Masters, U.S. Open, and British Open in the same calendar year. His margins of victory in the 1953 majors were five, six, and four strokes, respectively.

In 1953, the final two majors were in conflict on the schedule. The match-play PGA Championship was a seven-day event, held July 1–7 near Detroit; the British Open in Scotland was played July 8–10, with a mandatory 36-hole qualifier on July 6–7.

Course layout

Source:

Lengths of the course for previous major championships:

The first hole became a par 4 for majors in 1962.

Past champions in the field

Made the cut

Missed the cut 

Source:

Round summaries

First round 
Thursday, June 11, 1953

Source:

Second round 
Friday, June 12, 1953

Source:

Third round 
Saturday, June 13, 1953 (morning)

Final round 
Saturday, June 13, 1953 (afternoon)

(a) denotes amateur

References

External links 
 GolfCompendium.com: 1953 U.S. Open
 USOpen.com - 1953

U.S. Open (golf)
Golf in Pennsylvania
U.S. Open
U.S. Open golf
U.S. Open
U.S. Open golf